Subhashish Roy Chowdhury (born 27 September 1986) is an Indian professional footballer who plays as a goalkeeper for I-League club Real Kashmir.

Club career

Early career
Born in Kolkata, West Bengal, Chowdhury started his career at the Tata Football Academy. He began his professional career at East Bengal at the National Football League. He stayed at the club for one season before joining fellow NFL side Mahindra United in 2005. While with Mahindra United, Chowdhury helped his side win the Durand Cup in 2008; beating Churchill Brothers 3–2.

Dempo
After Mahindra United disbanded in 2010 Chowdhury signed for Dempo of the I-League. While with Dempo, Chowdhury helped the Goan side win the I-League in 2011.

Atlético de Kolkata
After the 2013–14 I-League season, it was confirmed that Chowdhury was released by Dempo and that he had signed with IMG-Reliance to take part in the Indian Super League for 2014. On 23 July 2014, it was announced that Chowdhury was selected by Atlético de Kolkata in the 2014 ISL Inaugural Domestic Draft in the eleventh round. He made his debut for Atlético de Kolkata on 12 October 2014 in the team's and league's opener against Mumbai City. Chowdhury managed to keep the clean-sheet and win the ISL Emerging player of the game award as Atlético de Kolkata won the match 3–0.

East Bengal 
As the tournament ended, Roy Chowdhury signed for I-League runners-up East Bengal.

Kerala Blasters
On 23 July 2017, Roy Chowdhury was selected in the seventh round of the 2017–18 ISL Players Draft by the Kerala Blasters for the 2017–18 Indian Super League season. He made his debut for the club on 31 December 2017 against Bengaluru. He started the match but had to come off in the 74th minute through injury as Kerala Blasters lost 3–1.

Jamshedpur
After spending a season with the Kerala Blasters, it was announced that Chowdhury had signed with fellow ISL side Jamshedpur on 26 April 2018.

NorthEast United
In 2019, Subhasish joined NorthEast United on a free transfer until 2021. In 2021 Subhasish extends his contract with NorthEast United for the 2021–22 Indian Super League season.

Honours

India
 AFC Challenge Cup: 2008
 SAFF Championship: 2011; runner-up: 2008
 Nehru Cup: 2009, 2012

India U20
 South Asian Games Silver medal: 2004

Atlético de Kolkata
Indian Super League: 2014

References

External links 
 

1986 births
Living people
Footballers from Kolkata
Indian footballers
East Bengal Club players
Mahindra United FC players
Dempo SC players
Kerala Blasters FC players
Odisha FC players
FC Goa players
ATK (football club) players
ATK (football club) draft picks
Kerala Blasters FC draft picks
Jamshedpur FC players
Association football goalkeepers
I-League players
Indian Super League players
Goa Professional League players
India international footballers
India youth international footballers
2011 AFC Asian Cup players
Footballers at the 2006 Asian Games
Asian Games competitors for India
NorthEast United FC players
South Asian Games silver medalists for India
South Asian Games medalists in football